Monvel is a town and former princely state on Saurashtra peninsula, in Gujarat, western India.

History 
Monvel was a minor princely state, also comprising two more villages, in the Halar prant of Kathiawar. It was ruled by Kathi Chieftains.

It had a combined population of 1,967 in 1901, yielding a state revenue of 18,299 Rupees (1903-4, nearly all from land) and paying a tribute of 313 Rupees, to the Gaekwar Baroda State]].

External links and Sources 
History
 Imperial Gazetteer, on dsal.uchicago.edu

Princely states of Gujarat
Kathi princely states